Duck and Cover is a 1990 compilation album, issued by SST Records, featuring cover songs by 13 punk and alternative rock bands.

Track listing 
 Hüsker Dü - "Eight Miles High" (Gene Clark/David Crosby/Roger McGuinn) - 3:57
 Meat Puppets - "Good Golly Miss Molly" (Robert "Bumps" Blackwell/John Marascalco) - 2:50
 Black Flag - "Louie Louie" (Richard Berry) - 1:20
 Volcano Suns - "Kick Out the Jams" (Michael Davis/Wayne Kramer/Fred "Sonic" Smith/Dennis Thompson/Rob Tyner) - 2:37
 Saccharine Trust - "Six Pack" (Greg Ginn) - 2:13
 Revolution 409 - "Crazy Horses" (Alan Osmond/Merrill Osmond/Wayne Osmond) - 2:27
 Dinosaur Jr - "Just Like Heaven" (Simon Gallup/Robert Smith/Porl Thompson/Lol Tolhurst/Boris Williams) - 2:54
 The Leaving Trains - "The Horse Song" (Rob Duprey/Iggy Pop) - 1:30
 Stone by Stone With Chris D. - "Ghost" (Eric Martin) - 4:37
 Minutemen - "Ain't Talkin' 'Bout Love" (Michael Anthony/David Lee Roth/Alex Van Halen/Eddie Van Halen) - 0:42
 Descendents - "Wendy" (Brian Wilson) - 2:20
 The Last - "Baby It's You" (Burt Bacharach/Mack David/Barney Williams) - 2:51
 Trotsky Icepick - "The Light Pours Out of Me" (Howard Devoto/John McGeoch/Pete Shelley) - 2:50

References

1990 compilation albums
Hardcore punk compilation albums
SST Records compilation albums